Fauxulidae is a family of gastropods belonging to the superfamily Pupilloidea of the order Stylommatophora. 

Genera:
 Afriboysidia Zilch, 1939
 Anisoloma Ancey, 1901
 Fauxulella Pilsbry, 1917
 Fauxulus Schaufuss, 1869
 Tomigerella Pfeiffer, 1879
Synonym
 Faula H. Adams & A. Adams, 1855: synonym of Fauxulus Schaufuss, 1869

References

External links
 Harl J., Haring E., Asami T., Sittenthaler M., Sattmann H. & Páll-Gergely B. (2017). Molecular systematics of the land snail family Orculidae reveal paraphyly and deep splits within the clade Orthurethra (Gastropoda: Pulmonata). Zoological Journal of the Linnean Society. 181(4): 778-794

Stylommatophora